Nina Konstantinovna Maslova (born  November 27, 1946) is a Soviet and Russian actress.

She is best known for her roles in "Big School-Break", "Ivan Vasilievich: Back to the Future" and "Afonya". She is a Merited Artist of the Russian Federation.

Filmography 
 1972–1973 Big School-Break (TV miniseries) as Viktoria Korovyanskaya
 1973 Ivan Vasilievich: Back to the Future as Tsaritsa  Marfa Vasilyevna
 1975 Afonya as Yelena
 1976 To Save the City as Masha
 1985 Dangerous for Your Life! as lady with the Dog
 1990 Aferisty as accountant
 1991 Depression as Lyuda
 2003 Bless the Woman as doctor

External links

1946 births
Living people
Actors from Riga
Soviet film actresses
Soviet television actresses
Soviet stage actresses
Russian film actresses
Russian television actresses
Russian stage actresses
Honored Artists of the Russian Federation